Valz may refer to:

People
 Benjamin Valz (1787–1867), French astronomer
 Ian Valz (1957-2010), Guyanese playwright
 Jean Valz (1746–1794), French politician

Places
 Valz-sous-Châteauneuf, France

Other
 Valz Prize, awarded by the French Academy of Sciences